Talerddig railway station was a station in Talerddig, Powys, Wales. The station opened in 1900 and closed on 14 June 1965, one of many on the line abandoned as a result of the Beeching Axe. The signal box predated the station, being built by McKenzie and Holland in 1874. The old Station Master's house now forms part of a private residence. The station was demolished shortly after closure.

References

Sources

Disused railway stations in Powys
Railway stations in Great Britain opened in 1900
Railway stations in Great Britain closed in 1965
Former Cambrian Railway stations
Beeching closures in Wales